Tosxampila mimica is a moth in the Castniidae family. It is found in Amazonas, Brazil.

References

Moths described in 1874
Castniidae